Claude Piegts, (born 1 January 1934 at Castiglione, French Algeria, shot by firing squad in France at the Fort du Trou d'Enfer 7 June 1962,) was a pied-noir and a member of the Organisation armée secrète (OAS). As a member of the OAS's Commando Delta, Piegts participated in the assassination of the Police Commissar of Algiers, for which he was condemned to death.

Biography 
A salesman in Algiers, Claude Piegts belonged to the Commando Delta under the orders of Lieutenant Roger Degueldre during the Algerian War. He participated with Albert Dovecar in the assassination of Police Commissaire Roger Gavoury on 31 May, 1961. Piegts was found guilty of the crime and sentenced to death. He was executed by firing squad on 7 June 1962 at the Fort du Trou d'Enfer, along with Dovecar.   

Claude Piegts was buried in the cemetery of Le Touvet in Isère, France.

References 

1934 births
1962 deaths
People from Bou Ismaïl
Pieds-Noirs
Members of the Organisation armée secrète
People of the Algerian War
People executed by the French Fifth Republic
Executed Algerian people
People executed for murdering police officers
French people convicted of murdering police officers
Executed French people
People executed by France by firing squad
Executed assassins